Más fuerte que la vida is the 16th studio album by Mexican pop singer Yuri. It was released in 1996.

History & Promotion
This is the first Ranchero album she had released. This is a collection of her past hits in a new Ranchera version and she was declared the Queen of the World Rancheras Festival. This album didn't receive proper promotion from Sony due to the "new & religious vision" of the singer. The sales were bad and the label decided to finish her contract.

Track listing 

[]

Singles
 Más Fuerte QuE la Vida (dedicated to Jesus)

1996 albums
Yuri (Mexican singer) albums